Beltline (or Belt Line) may refer to:

Places
BeltLine, Atlanta (or Belt Line or Beltline), a multi-use trail around central Atlanta, Georgia, United States
Beltline Trail, a multi-use trail in Toronto, Ontario, Canada
Beltline, Calgary, a neighbourhood of Calgary, Alberta, Canada

Transportation

Roads in the United States

The Beltline, a section of Alabama State Route 67 in Decatur, Alabama
The Beltline/ Beltline Hwy, a section of Interstate 65 in Mobile, Alabama
M-6 (Michigan highway) or South Beltline, a freeway in Grand Rapids, Michigan
Interstate 440 (North Carolina) or Raleigh Beltline, a loop road around Raleigh, North Carolina
Oregon Route 569, originally called Belt Line Road, a freeway (originally proposed as a beltway) in the Eugene, Oregon area
Belt Line Road (Texas), a loop in the Dallas, Texas area
Beltline Highway, part of U.S. Route 12 in the Madison, Wisconsin area

Rail services

Canada
Toronto Belt Line Railway, an 1890s commuter railroad in Toronto, Ontario, Canada
Toronto Railway Company Belt Line (1891–1923), a streetcar line in Toronto, Ontario, Canada
TTC Belt Line tour (mid 1970s), heritage streetcars that ran on the old Belt Line route in Toronto, Ontario, Canada

United States
Akron and Barberton Belt Railroad, Ohio
Baltimore Belt Line, built by the Baltimore and Ohio Railroad in 1895, Baltimore, Maryland
Belt Railway of Chicago, Illinois
Indiana Harbor Belt Railroad, a belt line railway in the Chicago, Illinois area

Other transportation
a general term for a beltway or ring road
Beltline (automotive), a line representing the bottom edge of a vehicle's glass panels